Ken Elton Kesey (September 17, 1935 – November 10, 2001) was an American novelist, essayist and countercultural figure. He considered himself a link between the Beat Generation of the 1950s and the hippies of the 1960s.

Kesey was born in La Junta, Colorado, and grew up in Springfield, Oregon, graduating from the University of Oregon in 1957. He began writing One Flew Over the Cuckoo's Nest in 1960 after completing a graduate fellowship in creative writing at Stanford University; the novel was an immediate commercial and critical success when published two years later. During this period, Kesey participated in government studies involving hallucinogenic drugs (including mescaline and LSD) to supplement his income.

After One Flew Over the Cuckoo's Nest was published, Kesey moved to nearby La Honda, California, and began hosting happenings with former colleagues from Stanford, miscellaneous bohemian and literary figures (most notably Neal Cassady) and other friends collectively known as the Merry Pranksters; these parties, known as Acid Tests, integrated the consumption of LSD with multimedia performances. He mentored the Grateful Dead (the Acid Tests' de facto house band) throughout their incipience and continued to exert a profound influence upon the group throughout their career.

Kesey's second novel, Sometimes a Great Notion—an epic account of the vicissitudes of an Oregon logging family that aspired to the modernist grandeur of William Faulkner's Yoknapatawpha saga—was a commercial success that polarized critics and readers upon its release in 1964. Kesey regarded it as his magnum opus.

In 1965, after an arrest for marijuana possession and faking suicide, Kesey was imprisoned for five months. Shortly thereafter, he returned home to the Willamette Valley and settled in Pleasant Hill, Oregon, where he maintained a secluded, family-oriented lifestyle for the rest of his life. In addition to teaching at the University of Oregon—an experience that culminated in Caverns (1989), a collaborative novel by Kesey and his graduate workshop students under the pseudonym "O.U. Levon"—he continued to regularly contribute fiction and reportage to such publications as Esquire, Rolling Stone, Oui, Running, and The Whole Earth Catalog; various iterations of these pieces were collected in Kesey's Garage Sale (1973) and Demon Box (1986).

Between 1974 and 1980, Kesey published six issues of Spit in the Ocean, a literary magazine that featured excerpts from an unfinished novel (Seven Prayers by Grandma Whittier, an account of Kesey's grandmother's struggle with Alzheimer's disease) and contributions from writers including Margo St. James, Kate Millett, Stewart Brand, Saul-Paul Sirag, Jack Sarfatti, Paul Krassner and William S. Burroughs. After a third novel (Sailor Song) was released to lukewarm reviews in 1992, he reunited with the Merry Pranksters and began publishing works on the Internet until ill health (including a stroke) curtailed his activities.

Biography

Early life 
Kesey was born in 1935 in La Junta, Colorado, to dairy farmers Geneva (née Smith) and Frederick A. Kesey. When Kesey was 10 years old, the family moved to Springfield, Oregon in 1946. Kesey was a champion wrestler in high school and college in the  weight division, and almost qualified to be on the Olympic team, but a serious shoulder injury halted his wrestling career. He graduated from Springfield High School in 1953. An avid reader and filmgoer, the young Kesey took John Wayne, Edgar Rice Burroughs and Zane Grey as his role models (later naming a son Zane) and toyed with magic, ventriloquism and hypnotism.

While attending the University of Oregon School of Journalism and Communication in neighboring Eugene in 1956, Kesey eloped with his high-school sweetheart, Oregon State College student Norma "Faye" Haxby, whom he had met in seventh grade. According to Kesey, "Without Faye, I would have been swept overboard by notoriety and weird, dope-fueled ideas and flower-child girls with beamy eyes and bulbous breasts." Married until his death, they had three children: Jed, Zane and Shannon. Additionally, with Faye's approval, Ken fathered a daughter, Sunshine Kesey, with fellow Merry Prankster Carolyn "Mountain Girl" Adams. Born in 1966, Sunshine was raised by Adams and her stepfather, Jerry Garcia.

Kesey had a football scholarship for his first year, but switched to the University of Oregon wrestling team as a better fit for his build. After posting a .885 winning percentage in the 1956–57 season, he received the Fred Low Scholarship for outstanding Northwest wrestler. In 1957, Kesey was second in his weight class at the Pacific Coast intercollegiate competition. He remains in the top 10 of Oregon Wrestling's all-time winning percentage.

A member of Beta Theta Pi throughout his studies, Kesey graduated from the University of Oregon with a B.A. in speech and communication in 1957. Increasingly disengaged by the playwriting and screenwriting courses that comprised much of his major, he began to take literature classes in the second half of his collegiate career with James B. Hall, a cosmopolitan alumnus of the Iowa Writers' Workshop who had previously taught at Cornell University and later served as provost of College V at the University of California, Santa Cruz. Hall took on Kesey as his protege and cultivated his interest in literary fiction, introducing Kesey (whose reading interests were hitherto confined to science fiction) to the works of Ernest Hemingway and other paragons of literary modernism. After the last of several brief summer sojourns as a struggling actor in Los Angeles, Kesey published his first short story ("First Sunday of September") in the Northwest Review and successfully applied to the highly selective Woodrow Wilson National Fellowship for the 1958–59 academic year.

Unbeknownst to Kesey, who applied at Hall's request, the maverick literary critic Leslie Fiedler (then based at the University of Montana) successfully importuned the regional fellowship committee to select the "rough-hewn" Kesey alongside more traditional fellows from Reed College and other elite institutions. Because he lacked the prerequisites to work toward a traditional master's degree in English as a communications major, Kesey elected to enroll in the non-degree program at Stanford University's Creative Writing Center that fall. While studying and working in the Stanford milieu over the next five years, most of them spent as a resident of Perry Lane (a historically bohemian enclave next to the university golf course), he developed intimate lifelong friendships with fellow writers Ken Babbs, Larry McMurtry, Wendell Berry, Ed McClanahan, Gurney Norman and Robert Stone.

During his initial fellowship year, Kesey frequently clashed with Center director Wallace Stegner, who regarded him as "a sort of highly talented illiterate" and rejected Kesey's application for a departmental Stegner Fellowship before permitting his attendance as a Woodrow Wilson Fellow. Reinforcing these perceptions, Stegner's deputy Richard Scowcroft later recalled that "neither Wally nor I thought he had a particularly important talent." According to Stone, Stegner "saw Kesey... as a threat to civilization and intellectualism and sobriety" and continued to reject Kesey's Stegner Fellowship applications for the 1959–60 and 1960–61 terms.

Nevertheless, Kesey received the prestigious $2,000 Harper-Saxton Prize for his first novel in progress (the oft-rejected Zoo) and audited the graduate writing seminar—a courtesy nominally accorded to former Stegner Fellows, although Kesey only secured his place by falsely claiming to Scowcroft that his colleague (on sabbatical through 1960) "had said that he could attend classes for free"—through the 1960–61 term. The course was initially taught that year by Viking Press editorial consultant and Lost Generation eminence grise Malcolm Cowley, who was "always glad to see" Kesey and fellow auditor Tillie Olsen. Cowley was succeeded the following quarter by the Irish short-story specialist Frank O'Connor; frequent spats between O'Connor and Kesey ultimately precipitated his departure from the class. While under Cowley's tutelage, he began to draft and workshop a manuscript that evolved into One Flew Over the Cuckoo's Nest.

Reflecting upon this period in a 1999 interview with Robert K. Elder, Kesey recalled, "I was too young to be a beatnik, and too old to be a hippie."

Experimentation with psychedelic drugs 

At the invitation of Perry Lane neighbor and Stanford psychology graduate student Vic Lovell, Kesey volunteered to take part in what turned out to be a CIA-financed study under the aegis of Project MKULTRA, a highly secret military program, at the Menlo Park Veterans' Hospital, where he worked as a night aide. The project studied the effects of psychedelic drugs, particularly LSD, psilocybin, mescaline, cocaine, aMT, and DMT. Kesey wrote many detailed accounts of his experiences with these drugs, both during the study and in the years of private drug use that followed.

Kesey's role as a medical guinea pig, as well as his stint working at the Veterans' Administration hospital, inspired One Flew Over the Cuckoo's Nest. The book's success, as well as the demolition of the Perry Lane cabins in August 1963, allowed him to move to a log house in La Honda, California, a rustic hamlet in the Santa Cruz Mountains 15 miles southwest of Stanford University. He frequently entertained friends and many others with parties he called "Acid Tests," involving music (including the Stanford-educated Anonymous Artists of America and Kesey's favorite band, the Grateful Dead), black lights, fluorescent paint, strobe lights, LSD, and other psychedelic effects. These parties were described in some of Allen Ginsberg's poems and served as the basis for Tom Wolfe's The Electric Kool-Aid Acid Test, an early exemplar of the nonfiction novel. Other firsthand accounts of the Acid Tests appear in Hell's Angels: The Strange and Terrible Saga of the Outlaw Motorcycle Gangs by Hunter S. Thompson and the 1967 Hells Angels memoir Freewheelin Frank: Secretary of the Angels (Frank Reynolds; ghostwritten by Michael McClure).

One Flew Over the Cuckoo's Nest 

While enrolled at the University of Oregon in 1957, Kesey wrote End of Autumn; according to Rick Dogson, the novel "focused on the exploitation of college athletes by telling the tale of a football lineman who was having second thoughts about the game". Kesey came to regard the unpublished work as juvenilia, but an excerpt served as his Stanford Creative Writing Center application sample.

During his Woodrow Wilson Fellowship year, Kesey wrote Zoo, a novel about beatniks living in the North Beach community of San Francisco, but it was never published.

The inspiration for One Flew Over the Cuckoo's Nest came while Kesey was working the night shift with Gordon Lish at the Menlo Park Veterans' Hospital. There, Kesey often spent time talking to the patients, sometimes under the influence of the hallucinogenic drugs he had volunteered to experiment with. He did not believe these patients were insane, but rather that society had pushed them out because they did not fit conventional ideas of how people were supposed to act and behave. Published under Cowley's guidance in 1962, the novel was an immediate success; in 1963, it was adapted into a successful stage play by Dale Wasserman, and in 1975, Miloš Forman directed a screen adaptation, which won the "Big Five" Academy Awards: Best Picture, Best Actor (Jack Nicholson), Best Actress (Louise Fletcher), Best Director (Forman) and Best Adapted Screenplay (Lawrence Hauben and Bo Goldman).

Kesey originally was involved in the film, but left two weeks into production. He claimed never to have seen the movie because of a dispute over the $20,000 he was initially paid for the film rights. Kesey loathed that, unlike the book, the film was not narrated by Chief Bromden, and he disagreed with Jack Nicholson's casting as Randle McMurphy (he wanted Gene Hackman). Despite this, Faye Kesey has said that her husband was generally supportive of the film and pleased that it was made.

Merry Pranksters 

When the 1964 publication of his second novel, Sometimes a Great Notion, required his presence in New York, Kesey, Neal Cassady, and others in a group of friends they called the Merry Pranksters took a cross-country trip in a school bus nicknamed Furthur. This trip, described in Tom Wolfe's The Electric Kool-Aid Acid Test (and later in Kesey's unproduced screenplay, The Furthur Inquiry) was the group's attempt to create art out of everyday life and to experience roadway America while high on LSD. In an interview after arriving in New York, Kesey said, "The sense of communication in this country has damn near atrophied. But we found as we went along it got easier to make contact with people. If people could just understand it is possible to be different without being a threat." A huge amount of footage was filmed on 16 mm cameras during the trip, which remained largely unseen until the release of Alex Gibney and Alison Elwood's 2011 film Magic Trip.

After the bus trip, the Pranksters threw parties they called Acid Tests around the San Francisco Bay Area from 1965 to 1966. Many of the Pranksters lived at Kesey's residence in La Honda. In New York, Cassady introduced Kesey to Jack Kerouac and Allen Ginsberg, who turned them on to Timothy Leary. Sometimes a Great Notion inspired a 1970 film starring and directed by Paul Newman; it was nominated for two Academy Awards, and in 1972 was the first film shown by the new television network HBO, in Wilkes-Barre, Pennsylvania.

In 1965, Kesey was arrested in La Honda for marijuana possession. In an attempt to mislead police, he faked suicide by having friends leave his truck on a cliffside road near Eureka, along with an elaborate suicide note written by the Pranksters. Kesey fled to Mexico in the back of a friend's car. He returned to the U.S. eight months later. On January 17, 1966, Kesey was sentenced to six months at the San Mateo County jail in Redwood City, California. Two nights later, he was arrested again, this time with Carolyn Adams, while smoking marijuana on the rooftop of Stewart Brand's Telegraph Hill home in San Francisco. On his release, he moved back to the family farm in Pleasant Hill, Oregon, in the Willamette Valley, where he spent the rest of his life. He wrote many articles, books (mostly collections of his articles), and short stories during that time.

Death of son 
On January 23, 1984, Kesey's 20-year-old son Jed, a wrestler for the University of Oregon, suffered severe head injuries on the way to Pullman, Washington, when the team's loaned van crashed after sliding off an icy highway. Two days later at Deaconess Hospital in Spokane, he was declared brain dead and his parents gave permission for his organs to be donated.

Jed's death deeply affected Kesey, who later called Jed a victim of policies that had starved the team of funding. He wrote to Senator Mark Hatfield: 

At a Grateful Dead concert soon after the death of promoter Bill Graham, Kesey delivered a eulogy, mentioning that Graham had donated $1,000 toward a memorial to Jed atop Mount Pisgah, near the Kesey home in Pleasant Hill. In 1988, Kesey donated $33,395 toward the purchase of a proper bus for the school's wrestling team.

Final years 
Kesey was diagnosed with diabetes in 1992. In 1994, he toured with members of the Merry Pranksters, performing a musical play he wrote about the millennium called Twister: A Ritual Reality. Many old and new friends and family showed up to support the Pranksters on this tour, which took them from Seattle's Bumbershoot all along the West Coast, including a sold-out two-night run at The Fillmore in San Francisco to Boulder, Colorado, where they coaxed the Beat Generation poet Allen Ginsberg into performing with them.

Kesey mainly kept to his home life in Pleasant Hill, preferring to make artistic contributions on the Internet or holding ritualistic revivals in the spirit of the Acid Test. In the Grateful Dead DVD The Closing of Winterland (2003) documenting the New Year's 1978/1979 concert at the Winterland Arena in San Francisco, Kesey is featured in a between-set interview.

On August 14, 1997, Kesey and his Pranksters attended a Phish concert in Darien Lake, New York. Kesey and the Pranksters appeared onstage with the band and performed a dance-trance-jam session involving several characters from The Wizard of Oz and Frankenstein.

In June 2001, Kesey was the keynote speaker at The Evergreen State College's commencement ceremony. His last major work was an essay for Rolling Stone magazine calling for peace in the aftermath of the September 11 attacks.

Death 
In 1997, health problems began to weaken Kesey, starting with a stroke that year. On October 25, 2001, Kesey had surgery at Sacred Heart Medical Center in Eugene on his liver to remove a tumor; he did not recover and died of complications several weeks later on November 10 at age 66.

Legacy 
The film Gerry (2002) is dedicated to Ken Kesey.

Kesey Square is in downtown Eugene, Oregon.

Works 
This is a selected list of Kesey's better-known works.

 
 
  A collection of essays
  A collection of essays and short stories
  "O.U. Levon" spelled backwards produces "novel U.O" This book was jointly written by a creative writing class taught by Kesey at the University of Oregon (U.O.).
  A play / photographic record
  A children's book
  A novel
  A Western genre novel
  A play
  An expansion of the 1967 journals that Kesey kept while incarcerated

See also 
 Summer of Love
 Wavy Gravy

Footnotes

Further reading 
 Ronald Gregg Billingsley, The Artistry of Ken Kesey. PhD dissertation. Eugene, OR: University of Oregon, 1971.
 Dedria Bryfonski, Mental illness in Ken Kesey's One Flew Over the Cuckoo's Nest. Detroit: Greenhaven Press, 2010.
 Rick Dodgson, It's All Kind of Magic: The Young Ken Kesey. Madison, WI: University of Wisconsin Press, 2013.
 Robert Faggen, "Ken Kesey, The Art of Fiction No. 136," The Paris Review, Spring 1994.
 Barry H. Leeds, Ken Kesey. New York: F. Ungar Publishing Co., 1981.
 Dennis McNally, A Long Strange Trip: the Inside History of the Grateful Dead. Broadway Books, 2002.
 Tim Owen, "Remembering Ken Kesey," Cosmik Debris Magazine, November 10, 2001.
 M. Gilbert Porter, The Art of Grit: Ken Kesey's Fiction. Columbia, MO: University of Missouri Press, 1982.
 Elaine B Safer, The contemporary American Comic Epic: The Novels of Barth, Pynchon, Gaddis, and Kesey. Detroit, MI: Wayne State University Press, 1988.
 Peter Swirski, "You're Not in Canada until You Can Hear the Loons Crying; or, Voting, People's Power and Ken Kesey's One Flew over the Cuckoo's Nest," in Swirski, American Utopia and Social Engineering in Literature, Social Thought, and Political History. New York: Routledge, 2011.
 Stephen L. Tanner, Ken Kesey. Boston, MA: Twayne, 1983.

External links 

 
 Bruce Carnes, Ken Kesey, Western Writers Series Digital Editions at Boise State University
 Ken Kesey and the Merry Pranksters
 
 Article on Ken Kesey lecture at Virginia Commonwealth University, Feb. 20, 1990
 Ken Kesey Documentary produced by Oregon Public Broadcasting
 Chip Brown, "Ken Kesey Kisses No Ass" Esquire Magazine; September 1992
 Ken Kesey On Misconceptions Of Counterculture, NPR's Fresh Air; August 12, 2011
 Ken Kesey papers at the University of Oregon
 

1935 births
2001 deaths
20th-century American essayists
20th-century American novelists
20th-century American short story writers
Activists from California
American male essayists
American male novelists
American male short story writers
American psychological fiction writers
Beat Generation writers
Counterculture festivals activists
Deaths from cancer in Oregon
Deaths from liver cancer
Novelists from Oregon
Oregon Ducks wrestlers
People from La Junta, Colorado
People from Pleasant Hill, Oregon
People from Springfield, Oregon
People who faked their own death
Postmodern writers
University of Oregon alumni
Wrestlers from Oregon
Writers from California
20th-century American male writers